Francisco José de Almeida Lopes (Vila Cova de Alva, 29 August 1955) is a Portuguese electrician and communist politician, currently serving as Member of the Assembly of the Republic. He gained national-wide attention as a candidate in the Portuguese presidential election of 2011.

References

Portuguese Communist Party politicians
Living people
1955 births
People from Arganil